Cringe is a response to embarrassment or social awkwardness.

Cringe may also refer to:

Cultural cringe, the feeling of inferiority about one's own culture
Cringe comedy, a comedy genre
Cringe pop, a genre of pop music
The Cringe, a U.S. rock band